Danny Santiago (born February 21, 1973) is an American former professional boxer who competed from 1997 to 2016. He challenged three times for a light heavyweight world title: the WBO/lineal titles in January 2007, the IBO title in December 2007, and the WBA/IBA titles in 2011.

Amateur career
Santiago had a strong amateur career, including the following highlights:
1995 Northeastern Regional Champion (178 Lbs.)
1996 Southeastern Regional Champion (178 Lbs.)
1996 Representative of Florida Bronze Medalists at 178Lbs, National Golden Gloves Tournament of Champions in Denver, Colorado
1996 International competition U.S.A. vs. Sweden representative of U.S.A. Silver Medalists at 178Lbs

Professional career
In 1997, Danny made his professional debut with a first round knockout of Michael Watkins. Between 1997 and 2002, Danny built a record of 22-0 and earned a shot at the WBA Fedelatin Light Heavyweight Title, where he  suffered his first loss against Rocky Torres.  By 2004, Danny defeated the highly ranked Elvir Muriqi in Madison Square Gardens with a devastating first round knockout.

Continually rated as a top light heavy-weight, Danny has faced some of best boxers of this millennium in world title fights, including:  Zsolt Erdei (WBO World Light Heavyweight Champion and WBC Cruiserweight Champion), Antonio Tarver, (WBC, WBA, IBF, and The Ring Light Heavyweight Champion and IBO World Light Heavyweight Champion), Beibut Shumenov (WBA World Light Heavyweight Champion and IBA Light Heavyweight Champion), and Danny Green (WBA Super Middleweight Champion and Light Heavyweight World Champion and IBO World Cruiserweight Champion).

In 2010,  Santiago was scheduled to fight Roy Jones, Jr, but the fight was cancelled due to an injury to Jones. 

Santiago was a contestant on ESPN’s very popular television series The Contender in 2007.  Santiago owned and operated a successful boxing gym which served as a popular training ground world champions, including Tavoris Cloud, Ricardo Mayorga, and Jermain Taylor.  

After his retirement from the ring, Santiago relocated to Colombia where he is a successful trainer and promoter.  

In 2021, Santiago was inducted into the Florida Boxing Hall of Fame.

Professional boxing record

References

External links

Boxers from New York City
Super-middleweight boxers
1973 births
Living people
Sportspeople from the Bronx
American male boxers